Kostadinov may refer to:

Aleksandar Kostadinov (born 1988), amateur Bulgarian Greco-Roman featherweight wrestler
Alipi Kostadinov (born 1955), retired Czechoslovak cyclist, specialized in road racing
Anton Kostadinov (born 1982), Bulgarian footballer currently playing as a midfielder
Branimir Kostadinov (born 1989), Bulgarian footballer
Dimitar Kostadinov (born 1999), Bulgarian footballer
Emil Kostadinov (born 1967), Bulgarian former professional footballer
Galin Kostadinov (born 1979), retired Bulgarian shot putter
Georgi Kostadinov (born 1950), former boxer from Bulgaria
Georgi Kostadinov (footballer) (born 1990), Bulgarian professional footballer
Ivo Kostadinov (born 1969), Bulgarian judoka
Kiko Kostadinov, Bulgarian fashion designer based in London
Kostadin Kostadinov (born 1959), former Bulgarian footballer
Kostadin Kostadinov (politician) (born 1979), Bulgarian politician, lawyer, historian, doctor of ethnography
Martin Kostadinov (born 1996), Bulgarian professional footballer
Miroslav Kostadinov (born 1976), Bulgarian singer and songwriter
Petar Kostadinov (born 1978), former Bulgarian footballer
Petar Kostadinov (water polo) (born 1954), Bulgarian water polo player
Stefan Kostadinov (born 1984), Bulgarian footballer
Tihomir Kostadinov (born 1996), Macedonian midfielder
Tomi Kostadinov (born 1991), Bulgarian footballer
Vladko Kostadinov (born 1987), Bulgarian football midfielder

See also
Kostadin
Kostadinovac
Kostadinović